William R. Butler (born July 10, 1937) is a former American football safety in the National Football League (NFL) for the Green Bay Packers, Dallas Cowboys, Pittsburgh Steelers and Minnesota Vikings. He also was a member of the Saskatchewan Roughriders in the Canadian Football League (CFL). He played college football at the University of Tennessee at Chattanooga.

Early years
Butler attended Berlin High School. He accepted a football scholarship from the University of Tennessee at Chattanooga.

In 1988, he was inducted into the UTC Athletics Hall of Fame.

Professional career

Green Bay packers
Butler was selected by the Green Bay Packers in the 19th round (217th overall) of the 1959 NFL Draft. Although he was initially waived in training camp, he was re-signed after the team cut fellow rookie Tim Brown.

He led the team in kickoff (21 returns - 22.5-yard avg.) and punt returns (18 returns - 9.1 average). He returned a punt for a 61-yard touchdown in a 28-17 loss against the Chicago Bears.

Dallas Cowboys
Butler was selected by the Dallas Cowboys in the 1960 NFL Expansion Draft and was moved to defense, becoming the first starting free safety in franchise history. He ranked second in the league in punt returns (10.1-yard avg.) and also had 20 kickoff returns with a 19.1-yard average.

On December 21, he was traded along with offensive tackle Dick Klein to the Pittsburgh Steelers in exchange for safety Dick Moegle.

Pittsburgh Steelers
In 1961, he had 3 interceptions, while playing 10 games as a backup safety. On April 7, 1962, he was traded to the Minnesota Vikings in exchange for a sixth round draft selection, completing a previous transaction.

Minnesota Vikings
In 1962, he started 12 games at safety and posted 5 interceptions (second on the team), returning one for a touchdown. He also led the team in kickoff (26 returns - 22.6-yard avg.) and punt returns (12 returns - 14.1-yard avg.).

In 1963, he repeated as the team leader in kickoff (33 returns - 21.6-yard avg.) and punt returns (21 returns - 10.5-yard avg.). In 1964, for the third season in a row, he led the team in kickoff (26 returns - 23-yard avg.) and punt returns (22 returns - 7.1-yard avg.).

Saskatchewan Roughriders
On August 20, 1965, Butler signed with the Saskatchewan Roughriders of the Canadian Football League (CFL). He was a two-way player and appeared in 12 games. He registered 44 carries for 138 yards (3.1-yard avg.), 16 receptions for 139 yards, one touchdown and 9 kickoff returns for 206 yards (22.9-yard avg.). He announced his retirement the following year.

Coaching career
In 1967, Butler was hired as an assistant football coach at Lakeland College—known now as Lakeland University—in Plymouth, Wisconsin to serve under John Thome, head football coach.

Butler lives in Berlin, Wisconsin and is the defensive coordinator for the Ripon High School football team and an assistant track and field coach.

References

1937 births
Living people
American football safeties
American players of Canadian football
Chattanooga Mocs football players
Dallas Cowboys players
Green Bay Packers players
Lakeland Muskies football coaches
Minnesota Vikings players
Pittsburgh Steelers players
Saskatchewan Roughriders players
High school football coaches in Wisconsin
High school track and field coaches in the United States
People from Berlin, Wisconsin
Coaches of American football from Wisconsin
Players of American football from Wisconsin